Live in London is a 2006 live album by Diane Schuur.

Track listing
 "Deedles' Blues" (Morgan Ames) – 5:09
 "I'll Close My Eyes" (Buddy Kaye, Billy Reid) – 4:37
 "Close Enough for Love" (Johnny Mandel, Paul Williams) – 4:17
 "As" (Stevie Wonder) – 6:47
 "Poinciana" (Buddy Bernier, Nat Simon) – 5:34
 "Don't Let Me Be Lonely Tonight" (James Taylor) – 4:07
 "You'd Be So Nice to Come Home To" (Cole Porter) – 4:14
 "When October Goes" (Barry Manilow, Johnny Mercer) – 5:37
 "Besame Mucho" (Consuelo Velazquez) – 6:56
 "The Very Thought of You" (Ray Noble) – 6:39
 "So in Love" (Porter) – 7:03
 "It Don't Mean a Thing (If It Ain't Got That Swing)" (Duke Ellington, Irving Mills) – 6:50
 "Send Me Someone to Love" (Curtis Mayfield) – 4:02
 "Over the Rainbow" (Harold Arlen) – 3:30

Personnel
 Diane Schuur – vocals, piano
 Rod Fleeman – guitar
 Scott Steed – double bass
 Reggie Jackson - drums

References

Diane Schuur live albums
2006 live albums